Berberis vulgaris, also known as common barberry, European barberry or simply barberry, is a shrub in the genus Berberis native to the Old World. It produces edible but sharply acidic berries, which people in many countries eat as a tart and refreshing fruit.

Description

Distribution and habitat

The shrub is native to central and southern Europe, northwest Africa and western Asia; it is also naturalised in northern Europe, including the British Isles and Scandinavia, and North America. In the United States and Canada, it has become established in the wild over an area from Nova Scotia to Nebraska, with additional populations in Colorado, Idaho, Washington state, Montana, and British Columbia. It is also cultivated in many countries.

Ecology 
The berries are an important food for many small birds, which disperse the seeds in their droppings.

B. vulgaris is the alternate host species of the wheat stem rust fungus (Puccinia graminis f. sp. tritici), a grass-infecting rust fungus that is a serious fungal disease of wheat and related grains. For this reason, cultivation of B. vulgaris is prohibited in Canada and some areas of the US (Connecticut, Massachusetts, Michigan, and New Hampshire).

Uses 

The edible berries, though rich in vitamin C, have a very sharp or sour flavor and are not widely consumed because the thorny shrubs make them difficult to harvest.

In Europe, the berries have been traditionally used as an ingredient in making jam. The berries are high in pectin which makes the jam congeal as it cools after having been boiled. In southwestern Asia, especially Iran, the berries are used for cooking, as well as for jam-making. In Iran, barberries are commonly used as a currant in rice pilaf.

 zerešk is the Persian name for the dried fruit of Berberis spp., particularly also that of Berberis integerrima called  zerešk bi-dâne, literally 'seedless barberry', which is widely cultivated in Iran. Iran is the largest producer of zerešk.

The South Khorasan province in Iran is the main area of zerešk and saffron production in the world, especially around Birjand and Qaen. About 85% of production is in Qaen and about 15% in Birjand. There is evidence of cultivation of seedless barberry in South Khorasan two hundred years ago. A garden of zerešk is called  zerešk-estân. Zerešk is widely used in cooking, imparting a tart flavor to chicken dishes. It is usually cooked with rice, called  zerešk polo, and provides a meal with chicken.

Other uses 

The plant has been widely cultivated for hedges in New Zealand.

Salishan people have used "barberry" to treat acne in their traditional medicine, although bark of the native Berberis aquifolium (Oregon grape) and other related species was used.  Native American Indians used the roots or berries as a general herbal tonic to stimulate appetite. A decoction of the plant has been used as a folk medicine to treat gastrointestinal ailments and coughs, although its use has been limited due to the bitter taste of the bark and root.

See also
Berberis microphylla, calafate (a related shrub with similar berries, native in temperate South America)

References

External links

Flora Europaea: Berberis vulgaris distribution

vulgaris
Medicinal plants of Africa
Medicinal plants of Asia
Medicinal plants of Europe
Plants described in 1753
Spices
Taxa named by Carl Linnaeus